Nolitha Ntobongwana (born 22 October 1969) is a South African educator and politician. She currently serves as the chairperson of the Portfolio Committee on Public Works and Infrastructure in the National Assembly. A member of the African National Congress, she has been a Member of Parliament since 2019. Ntobongwana had previously served in the Eastern Cape Provincial Legislature.

Background
Ntobongwana was born on 22 October 1969 in Qumbu in the Cape Province. She holds a secondary teacher's diploma and a Bachelor of Commerce in Accounting. She obtained a Masters in Public Administration from the University of Fort Hare. She has served as the deputy secretary of the South African Democratic Teachers Union (SADTU) branch in Qumbu, as the branch secretary of the ANC's Maqhutyana branch in the Mhlontlo Sub-Region in the OR Tambo Region, as the regional treasurer of the ANC's OR Tambo region, as the regional task team coordinator of the African National Congress Women's League in the OR Tambo region and as the provincial secretary of the ANC women's league in the Eastern Cape.

Ntobongwana served as an ANC councillor in the Mhlontlo Local Municipality from 2006 to 2011, and then as an ANC councillor in the OR Tambo District Municipality from 2011 to 2015. She was chief whip of the OR Tambo District Municipality during her time on the council. She also served in the Eastern Cape Provincial Legislature as an ANC representative.

Parliamentary career
Ntobongwana was elected to the National Assembly in the 2019 general election from the ANC's Eastern Cape list. She is currently the Chairperson of the  Portfolio Committee on Public Works and Infrastructure.

References

External links

Profile at African National Congress Parliamentary Caucus

Living people
1969 births
People from the Eastern Cape
Xhosa people
Members of the Eastern Cape Provincial Legislature
Women members of provincial legislatures of South Africa
Members of the National Assembly of South Africa
Women members of the National Assembly of South Africa
African National Congress politicians